Konaev (previously known as Kapshagay, ;  or ), is a city within and the administrative center of the Almaty Region of Kazakhstan. It is located on the Ili River, and has been built along with the construction of Kapshagay Dam on that river in the 1960s. The dam has formed Kapchagay Reservoir (a.k.a. Lake Kapshagai), a popular weekend destination for beach-goers from Almaty. Population:  

Many of Konaev's inhabitants fled the city after the dissolution of the Soviet Union, but its population saw a resurgence in 2000 and has since returned to pre-dissolution numbers.

President Kassym-Jomart Tokayev's reforms of 17 March 2022 included provisions which renamed Kapshagay to Konaev (after Dinmukhamed Kunaev) and made the city the new capital of Almaty Region following its old capital, Taldykorgan, being separated from the region and becoming the capital of the newly-created Zhetysu Region.

Geography
It is located on the shore of the Kapchagai reservoir, on the Ili River near its intersection with the railway, 76 km north of Almaty.

Administrative divisions 
 the city of Konaev;
 Zarechny rural district;
 Shengeldinsky rural district.

See also

Kapchagay Reservoir

References 

Cities and towns in Kazakhstan
Populated places in Almaty Region
Populated places established in the 1960s